The Vinho Verde Atlantic Open was a golf tournament on the European Tour in 1990. It was held at Estela Golf Club in Oporto, Portugal.

The tournament was won by Scotland's Stephen McAllister, who defeated Richard Boxall, Stephen Hamill, Ronan Rafferty, Anders Sørensen and David Williams in a six way playoff, the joint largest playoff in European Tour history. McAllister was the only player able to make par at the first playoff hole after all six had finished tied on 288 (level par) after 72 holes.

Its renewal was scheduled in 1991 but cancelled after Estela became the host venue for the Portuguese Open, which was then rescheduled to 21–24 March, the dates originally allocated for the Atlantic Open.

Winners

References

External links
Coverage on the European Tour's official site

Former European Tour events
Golf tournaments in Portugal